The King's Plate (Queen's Plate during the reign of female monarch) is a horse race, and the first leg of the Canadian Triple Crown.

King's Plate or Kings Plate or king plate and/or Queen's Plate or Queens Plate may also refer to:

Horse races
King's Plate (South Africa) (also "Queen's Plate"), run since 1861, known as the "King's Plate" from 1900 to 1952 and since 2023
King's Plate (UK) (also "Queen's Plate") at Newmarket Racecourse, England, UK; run between 1634 and 1765
 Queen Elizabeth Stakes (ATC), an Australian race in Sydney, New South Wales, known as Queen's Plate 1851–1872
 Queen Elizabeth Stakes (VRC), an Australian race in Melbourne, Victoria, known as the Queen's Plate 1854–1872
Oak Tree Stakes, a race at Goodwood Racecourse known as L'Ormarins Queen's Plate Stakes from 2014 to 2018.

Other uses
 a king plate, a breastplate, a form of regalia used by colonial authorities to recognize aboriginal chieftains in Australia

See also